The 2014 NASCAR Sprint All-Star Race (XXX) was a NASCAR Sprint Cup Series stock car race held on May 17, 2014, at Charlotte Motor Speedway in Concord, North Carolina. Contested over 90 laps, it was the second exhibition race of the 2014 NASCAR Sprint Cup Series.

Report

Race format
The race was 90 laps long, separated into five segments: four segments of 20 laps and a final segment of 10 laps. A mandatory pit stop was utilized between the final two segments, while pitting between the 20 lap segments was optional. Since the inaugural race in 1985, the format has changed ten times. In 2014, the Sprint Showdown was held on Friday –before the North Carolina Education Lottery 200 Camping World Truck Series race – instead of being before the All-Star Race.

Entry list
The All-Star Race was open to race winners from the 2013 Daytona 500 through the 2014 5-hour Energy 400 at Kansas Speedway and previous All-Star race winners from the past ten years were eligible to compete in the All-Star Race. The drivers who finished first and second in the Sprint Showdown, a 40-lap preliminary race, were also eligible to compete in the race, as well as the Sprint fan vote winner provided that the fan vote winner finished on the lead lap and a car still in race-able condition (the latter condition also applied to the Showdown winner and runner-up). The All-Star Race had 22 drivers, 19 of which were race winners.

The Showdown had 23 drivers of the 30 drivers eligible. Justin Allgaier chose to skip the All-Star weekend and focus on the following week's Coca-Cola 600. Allgaier, 29th in points, said accidents the previous weekends contributed to the team's decision to skip the non-points event. “For us, being a small independent team, obviously, the points races are the main focus,’’ said Allgaier, who was 29th in points. “With crashing a couple of weeks ago at Talladega and crashing last week at Kansas, it puts a toll on a team and this is going to allow us to really hit the reset button. “It’s crazy to think that you crash like that, jump out, walk to the ambulance and go home and wake up the next day and not even feel like you crashed."

Sprint Showdown entry list

Sprint All-Star Race entry list

Practice

Sprint Showdown practice

Sprint All-Star Race practice

Sprint Showdown qualifying

Sprint Showdown qualifying results

Sprint Showdown
The Showdown started at 7:22 p.m. on Friday. Marcos Ambrose got nicked in the rear by Ricky Stenhouse Jr. and spun out to bring out the first caution on lap 3. Clint Bowyer took the lead from A. J. Allmendinger at the end of segment one. Michael Annett stayed out during the caution period and assumed the lead. He spun the tires on the restart and just about took a few cars out. Clint Bowyer took the victory in the Showdown, advancing to the Sprint All-Star Race along with Allmendinger. Josh Wise advanced to the All-Star Race by winning the fan vote. "This is kind of a big deal for our sport," Wise said after the Showdown Friday night. "It's a lot of young kids and people from around the world. I've had the chance to interact with a lot of them, and there's a lot of people who had never watched a NASCAR race who have now watched several, so it's a pretty cool deal."

Sprint Showdown results

Sprint All-Star Race qualifying
For the first time, the three drivers who transferred from the Showdown participated in All-Star Race qualifying, rather than automatically starting at the rear of the all-star field. They could work on their cars prior to the NASCAR Sprint All-Star Race.

Sprint All-Star Race qualifying

NASCAR Sprint All-Star Race
The All-Star Race was scheduled to begin at 9:20 p.m. on Saturday but was pushed back by almost half an hour. In segments one, two and three, all laps were counted, with teams having the option to pit during the breaks. In segment four, all laps were counted, with the running order at the completion of the segment being repositioned, based on the average finish of the first four segments. Running order ties were broken by the finish of the fourth segment. Pit road was open for a mandatory four-tire pit stop, with the order of cars returning to the track determining the starting order of the fifth and final segment. Only green flag laps counted in the final segment.

Segment one
Kyle Busch took the lead from Carl Edwards and kept it through the first segment. During the optional pit stops, everybody but Denny Hamlin pitted.

Segment two
On lap 26, in the second segment, Kyle Busch and Clint Bowyer made contact on the backstretch, with Busch hitting the wall and taking out Joey Logano. "Kurt (Busch) got real bottled up on the outside and slowed down so I knew I was clear to go to the bottom and swoop down and try to get underneath Bowyer," Kyle Busch said. "When I did, he blocked me and I hit him and he got squirrely and then I was still under him and it hit me and turned me around the wrong way on the backstretch and got in the outside wall." Logano stated that "they were just crashing in front of me", and that he "thought he was going to stay up by the wall and he started coming down. I was in the wrong spot and I couldn't get low enough quick enough as quick as he was coming down." On lap 31, A. J. Allmendinger was turned by Brian Vickers, who was pushed by Greg Biffle, and hit the inside wall on the backstretch. On lap 37, Hamlin started falling to the rear. Kasey Kahne finished in the lead at the end of segment two; just like the break in the first segment, everybody but four cars pitted. Kahne led at the end of segment three as well, with everybody pitting after the segment.

Segment three
After restarting on lap 61, Jeff Gordon veered up in front of Martin Truex Jr. and Biffle, and hit the wall to bring out the sixth caution. "Something broke, I'm not exactly sure what," Gordon said. "I was just going down the backstraightaway going into Turn 3 and I just felt something in the front end give. As I got to the corner, the car went straight."

Segment four
With three laps remaining in segment four, Ryan Newman slammed the wall in turn 4. Kevin Harvick led at the end of segment four and Kahne hit the wall. Harvick led the field down pit road since he had the best average finish in the four segments. Kahne had the second best in the four segments and therefore would've entered pit road second but did not because of pitting before pit road was open. Because of this, Jamie McMurray did.

Final segment
On the final, mandatory, four-tire stop, Carl Edwards won the race off pit road. On the restart, Jamie McMurray took the lead from Carl Edwards and took the checkered flag. "As a kid, that is what you grew up wanting to do, is have a shootout like that and have a possibility to race for 10 laps," McMurray said. "He got a little bit of a jump on me on the restart and I was able to hang on to his quarter panel, and when we kept entering Turn 1 and 3, I was like, "It is for a million bucks. If we wreck, it's not that big of a deal." It's so cool to come out on top."

Sprint All-Star Race results

Media

Television

Radio

Notes

References

Sprint All-Star Race
Sprint All-Star Race
NASCAR races at Charlotte Motor Speedway
NASCAR Sprint All-Star Race
NASCAR All-Star Race